Camponotus lateralis is a species of ant in the genus Camponotus. The species has a wide range and is found in the countries around the Mediterranean, Crimea, Caucasus, northwestern Africa, Asia Minor and Kopet Dag (a mountain range between Turkmenistan and Iran).

Subspecies
Camponotus lateralis cypridis Santschi, 1939
Camponotus lateralis purius Santschi, 1929
Camponotus lateralis rhodius Santschi, 1934

References

External links

lateralis
Hymenoptera of Europe
Hymenoptera of Asia
Insects described in 1792